Casaleggio railway station is the train station serving the comune of Casaleggio, in the Piedmont region, northwestern Italy. It is the junction of the Biella–Novara.

The station is currently managed by Rete Ferroviaria Italiana (RFI).  However, the passenger building is private residence. Train services are operated by Trenitalia.  Each of these companies is a subsidiary of Ferrovie dello Stato (FS), Italy's state-owned rail company.

History
The station was opened on 18 May 1939 along with the rest of the line, but did not become operational until 20 July 1940 because of the need to complete several systems and a lack of rolling stock.

From 21 January 1961, in advance to the end of the concession to the "Società Ferrovia Biella-Novara (SFBN)" company, the management of the railway line passed to the state and the exercise of the stations was assumed by Ferrovie dello Stato.

In the year 2000, the plant management passed to Rete Ferroviaria Italiana, which is classified in the category "Bronze".

Features
Two tracks of which are equipped with platforms.

Train services
The station is served by the following service(s):

Regional services (Treno regionale) Biella San Paolo - Novara

See also

 History of rail transport in Italy
 List of railway stations in Piedmont
 Rail transport in Italy
 Railway stations in Italy

References

External links

Railway stations in Piedmont
Railway stations opened in 1939